The 1999 East Northamptonshire District Council election took place on 6 May 1999 to elect members of East Northamptonshire District Council in Northamptonshire, England. This was on the same day as other local elections. This was the first election to be held under new ward boundaries. The Conservative Party regained overall control of the council from the Labour Party, which it had lost at the previous election in 1995.

Ward-by-Ward Results

Barnwell Ward (1 seat)

Dryden Ward (1 seat)

Fineshade Ward (1 seat)

Higham Ferriers Ward (3 seats)

Irthlingborough Ward (3 seats)

Kings Forest Ward (1 seat)

Lower Nene Ward (1 seat)

Lyveden Ward (1 seat)

Oundle Ward (2 seats)

Prebendal Ward (1 seat)

Raunds Saxon Ward (2 seats)

Raunds Windmill Ward (2 seats)

Ringstead Ward (1 seat)

Rushden East Ward (3 seats)

Rushden North Ward (3 seats)

Rushden South Ward (3 seats)

Rushden West Ward (3 seats)

Stanwick Ward (1 seat)

Thrapston Ward (2 seats)

Woodford Ward (1 seat)

References

1999 English local elections
1999
1990s in Northamptonshire